John Adams Bliss (February 13, 1843 - 1925) served in the California State Assembly for the 50th district from 1899 to 1907 and during the American Civil War he served in the United States Army.

References

1843 births
1925 deaths
Union Army soldiers
19th-century American politicians
Republican Party members of the California State Assembly
People from Wilbraham, Massachusetts